Henry Youngman (1848–1927) was a Methodist minister. He was President-General of the Methodist Church of Australasia and often described as the Father of Methodism in Queensland.

Early life 
Youngman was born in Kidderminster, England in December 1848. As a boy, he immigrated with his parents to Goulburn, New South Wales, where they worshipped at the Wesleyan Church.

Religious life 
Under the tuition of the late Rev. William Curnow, the minister of that circuit, Henry Youngman proved to be an apt pupil in all that pertained to preaching, and in the year 1871 was appointed to the ministry to the difficult circuit of Fish River, with residence at Oberon. The following year he was sent to Deniliquin, and then spent two years as second minister of the Mudgee circuit. Three years were spent in Tamworth, and then followed terms in Adelong, Newtown, Ashfield and Wollongong.

At the end of 1887 when absent from the Conference, Youngman was appointed to Queensland, to the Albert Street circuit in Brisbane. He learned of his appointment when he opened the morning paper at his breakfast-table. He served at Albert Street from 1888 to 1892, being very involved in the sale of the old site and the purchase of the present site. From Brisbane he went to Toowoomba (1891 to 1893), then to Toowong (1893-1896), and following that to Ipswich (1896-1899) and Gympie (1900–1903). At the end of three years (1904–1906) in West End, Brisbane, Youngman was made Connexional Secretary in the year 1907, and this post he practically held up to the time of his death.

In the 1890s Youngman was active in trying to unite the Wesleyan Methodists and Primitive Methodists in Queensland, contributing to the formation of the Methodist Church of Australasia in 1902 which amalgamated a number of previously separate Methodist denominations.

When Youngman came to Brisbane in 1888 he  saw that it was essential for Methodism that a Conference be established, and he lost no chance of urging for this. His efforts were rewarded in time, and the Conference was established in 1890 and he was the first President. In 1898, and again in 1907, he was called to the chair. In 1907 he was elected Secretary of the General Conference, and in 1910 was elected President-General of the Methodist Church of Australasia. Eleven years were spent in the chair of the connexional editor, and many other offices were held by him.

From 1921 to 1924 he was Chairman of the Presbyterian and Methodist Schools Association in Queensland.

For several years he was joint editor of "The Methodist", with the Revs. G. Martin and B. J. Meek. He also served as an editor of "Weekly Advocate" and "Christian Witness".

Youngman excelled as a preacher and his success in many aspects of Methodist ministry demonstrated that a man could succeed in ministry without the benefit of formal scholastic training. In 1913 the Victoria University of Toronto conferred the degree of Doctor of Divinity on Youngman in recognition of his eminent gifts and conspicuous service to Methodism in Queensland.

Later life 
Youngman died at his residence in Dean Street, Toowong, Brisbane, early on Friday 11 March 1927 following several months of illness. As he had requested, it was a quiet funeral. He was buried in Toowong Cemetery on Saturday 12 March 1927. His second wife, three sons and a daughter survived him.

He is commemorated by a memorial tablet in the Albert Street Uniting Church. It was unveiled by John Gladwell Wheen, the President-General of the Methodist Church of Australasia on Thursday 1 March 1928.

His headstone in Toowong Cemetery was removed by the Brisbane City Council in the mid-1970s as part of a program to clean up "unsightly/demolished graves".

References 

Australian Methodist ministers
1848 births
1927 deaths
English emigrants to Australia
People from Kidderminster